The wing-banded antbird (Myrmornis torquata) is a species of passerine bird in the antbird family, Thamnophilidae. It is placed in the monotypic genus Myrmornis.
It is found in Brazil, Colombia, Ecuador, French Guiana, Guyana, Nicaragua, Panama, Peru, Suriname, and Venezuela. Its natural habitat is subtropical or tropical moist lowland forests.

Taxonomy
The wing-banded antbird was described by French polymath Georges-Louis Leclerc, Comte de Buffon in 1779 in his Histoire Naturelle des Oiseaux from a specimen collected in Cayenne, French Guiana. The bird was also illustrated in a hand-coloured plate engraved by François-Nicolas Martinet in the Planches Enluminées D'Histoire Naturelle which was produced under the supervision of Edme-Louis Daubenton to accompany Buffon's text. Neither the plate caption nor Buffon's description included a scientific name but in 1783 the Dutch naturalist Pieter Boddaert coined the binomial name Formicarius torquatus in his catalogue of the Planches Enluminées. The wing-banded antbird is now the only species placed in the genus Myrmornis that was introduced by the French naturalist Johann Hermann in 1783. The generic name combines the Ancient Greek murmēx meaning "ant" and ornis meaning "bird". The specific name torquata or torquatus is the Latin for "collared".

Two subspecies are recognised:
 M. t. stictoptera (Salvin, 1893) – east Nicaragua to northwest Colombia
 M. t. torquata (Boddaert, 1783) – Amazonia

The online edition of the Handbook of the Birds of the World treats the two subspecies as separate species: the northern wing-banded antbird (Myrmornis stictoptera) and the southern wing-banded antbird (Myrmornis torquata).

References

External links
Xeno-canto: audio recordings of the wing-banded antbird

wing-banded antbird
Birds of Nicaragua
Birds of Panama
Birds of the Amazon Basin
Birds of Colombia
Birds of the Ecuadorian Amazon
Birds of the Peruvian Amazon
Birds of the Guianas
wing-banded antbird
Birds of Brazil
Taxonomy articles created by Polbot